Suk-won, also spelled Seok-won, is a Korean masculine given name. Its meaning differs based on the hanja used to write each syllable of the name. There are 20 hanja with the reading "suk" and 35 hanja with the reading "won" on the South Korean government's official list of hanja which may be registered for use in given names.

People with this name include:
Kim Suk-won (1893–1978), general in the Imperial Japanese Army and Republic of Korea Army
Kim Seok-won (born 1961), South Korean footballer
Lee Seok-won (born 1971), lead singer of South Korean rock group Onnine Ibalgwan
Jung Suk-won (born 1985), South Korean actor
Jang Suk-Won (born 1989), South Korean footballer

See also
List of Korean given names

References

Korean masculine given names